Alsophila esmeraldensis is a species of tree fern which is endemic to Ecuador. It grows in coastal forest and forested slopes of the Andes.

Description
The erect, slender trunk is about 80 cm tall and approximately 3 cm in diameter. Fronds may be either simply pinnate or bipinnate basally. They are erect or spreading and up to 2.5 m long. The rachis ranges in colour from dark brown to blackish and bears a few scales. The scales are linear, bicoloured (whitish with a central brown region) and with edges and apexes with dark setae. Sori are covered by cup-like indusia. Alsophila esmeraldensis forms part of the group centered on Alsophila minor.

References

esmeraldensis
Ferns of Ecuador
Endemic flora of Ecuador
Flora of the Andes
Flora of Esmeraldas Province
Ferns of the Americas
Endangered flora of South America